is a city located in Fukuoka Prefecture, Japan. The city was founded on October 1, 2018.

The city has an estimated population of 50,444 and a density of 670 persons per km2. It is connected to Hakata Station by an 8-minute shinkansen trip.

References

External links

Nakagawa official website 

 
Cities in Fukuoka Prefecture
Populated places established in 2018
2018 establishments in Japan